Maraslis's House is at 4 Pushkinska Street in Odesa.

History
The house was the home of Grigorios Maraslis who was the Mayor of Odessa. He lived here from 1831 to 1907. The house had belonged to his father (1780–1853) who had the same name. It is not known who is the architect, but his father had bought this house in the 1820s.

During the Soviet era the house had a number of uses including as a hospital and an Oncology centre.

The building has a plaque outside that notifies visitors of its significance. There is also a QRpedia code that links to this article.

References

Buildings and structures in Odesa
Tourist attractions in Odesa
Pushkinska Street, Odesa